This is a list of ambassadors of Northern Cyprus to Turkey. The ambassador is the head of the Embassy of Northern Cyprus in Ankara.

Representatives

Ambassadors

Further reading 
Ekrem Yeşilada's literature work on Cyprus - NEU Grand Library

References 

Diplomatic missions of Northern Cyprus
Northern Cyprus–Turkey relations
Cyprus–Turkey relations